Robertinho Silva (born 1941) is a Brazilian drummer known for jazz. His first album was Música Popular Brasileira in 1981.

He began his career with the band Som Imaginário with Zé Rodrix, Wagner Tiso and Luiz Alves.

He has played with many famous musicians including João Donato, Marcos Valle, Milton Nascimento (with whom he has worked for 26 years), Aleuda Silva, Pablo Silva, Gilberto Gil, Taiguara, Toninho Horta, Roberto Carlos, Gal Costa, João Bosco, Paulo Moura, Airto Moreira, Moacyr Santos, Ron Carter, Wayne Shorter, Shelly Manne, Peggy Lee, Cal Tjader, Sarah Vaughan, George Duke, Flora Purim, Egberto Gismonti, George Benson.

Discography
 Robertinho Silva (Philips, 1981)
 Bateria (Carmo, 1983)
 Triângulo (Carmo, 1985)
 Bodas de Prata (CBS, 1989)
 Shot on Goal (Milestone, 1995)
 Brazilian Mixture (Prestige, 2009)
 Duo + Dois (Selo, 2019)

See also
 Mário Negrão

References

Brazilian jazz composers
Jazz bandleaders
Brazilian jazz drummers
1941 births
Living people
Milestone Records artists